Triangle United Football Club is a Zimbabwean football club based in Triangle. They play in the top division of Zimbabwean football, the Zimbabwe Premier Soccer League.

The clubs plays in white and green kits, and have done so since their formation in 1972.

Stadium
Currently the team plays at the 3,000 capacity Gibbo Stadium.

Rivals
Chiredzi FC is their main and local rival.Their rivalry can be traced back to when both teams played in Division 1.

References

External links

Football clubs in Zimbabwe